Simon Stephen Milne  (born January 1959) is a British marine officer and conservationist who has been Regius Keeper of the Royal Botanic Garden Edinburgh since 2014.

Early life and military career 
Born in 1959, Milne was educated at the University of St Andrews and the Royal Naval College, Greenwich. He was commissioned into the Royal Marines in 1976 and served in Northern Ireland and Bosnia. He was appointed a member of the Order of the British Empire in 1996. He reached the rank of lieutenant colonel and was invalided in 2000. He was later made a member of Her Majesty's bodyguard of the Honourable Corps of Gentlemen at Arms in July 2011.

Conservation career 
Milne was director of the Sir Harold Hillier Gardens and Arboretum from 2000 to 2004 and chief executive of the Scottish Wildlife Trust from October 2004 until February 2014. Starting in 2007, he co-led the trial reintroduction of the European beaver to Scotland, with the Scottish Wildlife Trust working alongside the Royal Zoological Society of Scotland. He is the founder of the World Forum on Natural Capital and has specific interest and expertise in translocations, public engagement with the natural environment, biodiversity conservation and ecosystem scale approach.

Milne was appointed the 16th Regius Keeper of the Royal Botanic Garden Edinburgh in February 2014, replacing botanist Stephen Blackmore. He is a fellow of the Royal Geographical Society and was conferred an honorary professor of the University of Edinburgh, associated to the School of Biological Sciences in January 2016.

Personal life 
Milne married his wife Françoise in 1993 and the couple have three children together. Originally from France, she applied for dual-nationality following the 2016 EU referendum but her application was rejected, leading the couple to publicly criticise the uncertainty created by Brexit.

References

Living people
Alumni of the University of St Andrews
British conservationists
Members of the Order of the British Empire
Fellows of the Royal Geographical Society
Honourable Corps of Gentlemen at Arms
1959 births